Madian Gavaber (also Romanized as Mādīān Gavāber; also known as Mādīngovāber) is a village in Otaqvar Rural District, Otaqvar District, Langarud County, Gilan Province, Iran. At the 2006 census, its population was 113, in 24 families.

References 

Populated places in Langarud County